Ham Street or Hamstreet may refer to two places in England:
 Ham Street, Somerset, a hamlet near Baltonsborough
 Hamstreet, a village in Kent
 Ham Street railway station